EMIC may refer to:

 Central Emergency Operation Center, Taiwan
 Eagle Mountain International Church, Texas, United States
 Earth systems model of intermediate complexity, a class of climate models
 Emergency Maternity and Infant Care Program, a medical program set up under the New Deal in the United States
 Team EMIC, a racing team in the Formula 1 Powerboat World Championship

See also 
 Emic, a type of field research in the social sciences